The 1970–71 Iowa State Cyclones men's basketball team represented Iowa State University during the 1970–71 NCAA Division I men's basketball season. The Cyclones were coached by Glen Anderson, who was in his twelfth and final season with the Cyclones. They played their home games at the Iowa State Armory in Ames, Iowa for the final season. Anderson was replaced at head coach by Maury John, and the Armory was replaced with Hilton Coliseum.

They finished the season 5–21, 2–12 in Big Eight play to finish in a tie for seventh place.

Roster

Schedule and results 

|-
!colspan=6 style=""|Regular Season

|-

References 

Iowa State Cyclones men's basketball seasons
Iowa State
Iowa State Cyc
Iowa State Cyc